The Building and Wood Workers' International (BWI) is the global union federation of democratic and free trade unions in the building, building materials, wood, forestry and allied industries.

History
The federation was established in 2005, by the merger of the International Federation of Building and Wood Workers (IFBWW) and the World Federation of Building and Wood Workers (WFBW). , it has 350 member organisations in 135 countries, representing a combined membership of more than 12 million workers.

Organisation
The BWI is based in Geneva, Switzerland. Regional Offices and Project Offices are located in Panama and Malaysia, South Africa, India, Australia, Burkina Faso, Bulgaria, Lebanon, Kenya, South Korea, Russia, Argentina, Peru and Brazil. The organisation works closely with the International Trade Union Confederation (ITUC) and the other global union federations, and has a Special Consultative Status to the Economic and Social Committee of the United Nations.

The BWI holds its World Congress every four years, consisting of delegates from the member organisations. The congress establish set the priorities and strategy for the organisation, and elects the World Council, which meets once a year. As supreme governing body during the intercongress period, it is responsible for all policies and operations of the BWI. The World Council subsequently appoints a World Board, which is responsible for the administration of the BWI and for the implementation of its policies. The World Board meets twice a year.

The organisation's headquarters is located in Geneva, in Switzerland.

Leadership

General Secretaries
2005: Anita Normark
2009: Hör Ambet Yuson

Presidents
2005: Klaus Wiesehügel
2013: Per-Olof Sjöö

References
Membership info at BWI website.

External links

Building and Wood Workers' International

 
Organisations based in Geneva
Organizations established in 2005